Deepak Deulkar, also spelled Dewoolkar, is a TV serial actor in India. He is famous for his role of Balram in the TV series Krishna.

Early life
He started playing cricket when he was in Siddarth college, Fort. Deulkar was a successful spinner and played for the Mumbai Under-19 team. An injury to his finger left him unable to play for a prolonged period of time, which led to his being dropped from the team. After graduating college, he chose to try the entertainment industry. He became famous for his character of Mahadev Thakur, in the ETV Marathi serial Lek Ladki Ya Gharchi. He was also the script writer of the movie Saad. He was famous for his role in many TV serials like Krishna (where he played Balarama), Sapane Sajan Ke, Ye Risha Kya... and Lek Ladaki Hya Gharachi, are the best examples of his popularity as a TV star.

Deulkar is married to Nishigandha Wad. They have one daughter, Ishwari.

Filmography
Lead role in Some of Commercial Hit Marathi Films:
 Vaat Pahte Punvechi (Bal Joglekar)
 JanmaDaata (V. N. Mayekar)
 Maza Saubhagya (N. S. Vaidya)
 Dhani Kunkawacha (N. Relekar)
 Sasar Maher (Jayashree Gadkar) 
 Sarnradhni (Viju Patel) 
 Topi Var Topi (N. Relekar) 
 Pratidav (Vilas Rakte)
 Navra Majya Muthit Ga (R. K. Mehta) 
 Sasar Maze Bhagyache (Abu Bhai)
 Paath Rakhin (Ganesh Jadhav)
 Ladhai (Viju Patel)
 Shanti Ne Keli Kranti Tuch (N. Relekar)
 Mazi Bhagyalaxmi (Pitamber Kale)
 Saakhar Puda (N. S. Vaidya)
 Mangal Sutra (Bhaskar J. adhav)
 Saunsar Chakra (Ganesh Jadhav)
 Mith Bhakar (Afzal Bhagwan)

Lead role in Selective Hindi Serials:
  Krishna as Balrama on DD National. Director: Ramanand Sagar
 Panthar on Home TV. Director - Gautam Adhikari
 Aparajita on DDNational. Director - Alok Nath Dixit
 Saath Saath on Zee TV. Director - Prashant Chothani
 Mukkaddar on DDNational. Director - Ashish Patil
 BadIa on DDNational. Director - Mohan Kaul
 Tehkikaat on Star TV Star. Director - Karan Razdan
 Raaz on Star TV. Director - Karan Razdan
 X Zone on Zee TV. Director - Shahab Shamshi
 Saturday Suspense on Zee TV. Director - Shahab Shamshi
 Aahat on Sony. Director - BP. Singh
 Morarji on DDNational. Director Devendra Khandelwal
  C.I.D. on Sony. Director - B. P. Singh
 Sapne Saajan Ke on DDNational. Director- Alok Nath Dixit
 Jahan Pe Basera Ho on Star Plus. Director - Naresh Malhotra
 Yeh Rishta Kya Kehlata Hai on Star Plus. Director - Rajan Shahi

Lead role in Marathi Serials:
 Damini on Doordarshan. Director - Kanchan Adhikari
 Album on Zee Marathi. Director- Ajeet Kumar
 Bandini on Doordarshan. Director - Gautam Adhikari / Ashish Patil
 Lek Ladki Hya Gharchi on Etv Marathi. Director - Mahesh Tagde
 Tuzh Vin Sakhya Re on Star Pravah. Director Mahesh Tagde / Raju Sawant
 Sawar Re on Etv Marathi. Director Ajay Mayekar

Lead role in Marathi Drama / Play:
 Lagna. Director - KamlakarSarang, writer- Jaywant Dalvi
 Kaal Chakra. Director - Damu Kenkre, Writer - Jaywant Dalvi
 Saudamini. Director - Arun Nalawde, Writer - Shekhar Patil

References

Indian male film actors
Indian male television actors
Living people
Place of birth missing (living people)
Year of birth missing (living people)